Sally Creighton was an American actress, best known for her roles as Mrs Patricia Gregory on Magic Island, and Mrs Chapman in Howard Hawks' 1951 film, The Thing from Another World.

Creighton worked as a dialogue director for films and as a dramatic coach before she became a film actress.

Radio
 Magic Island as Mrs Patricia Gregory (1935)
 Lux Radio Theater (1937–39)

Filmography

References

External links 

 

American film actresses
American radio actresses
20th-century American actresses